The 2009 Ohio Bobcats football team competed on behalf of Ohio University during the 2009 NCAA Division I FBS football season. The Bobcats were led by head coach Frank Solich and played their home games in Peden Stadium located in Athens, Ohio.

The Bobcats finished the season 9–5, 7–1 in MAC play to be co-champions of the east division. Ohio represented the east division in the MAC Championship Game, losing to Central Michigan 20–10. The Bobcats were invited to the Little Caesars Pizza Bowl, losing to Marshall 21–17.

Schedule

References

Ohio
Ohio Bobcats football seasons
Ohio Bobcats football